Eric Schaeffer (born January 22, 1962) is an American actor, writer, and director.

Early life and education
Schaeffer was born in New York City, New York, and later graduated with a degree in drama and dance from Bard College. After graduating, he drove a New York City taxi for nine years, during which time he wrote two stage plays, a novel, twenty screenplays and various other works.

Career
Schaeffer rose to fame with fellow actor/writer/director Donal Lardner Ward  on the independent film, My Life's in Turnaround (1993), which was made in fifteen days for only $200,000. Schaeffer and Ward parlayed the film's success into Too Something (1995–1996), a short-lived sitcom that was briefly renamed New York Daze.

He signed on as a client of Creative Artists Agency and made a deal to direct the 1996 romantic comedy If Lucy Fell for a budget of $3.5 million for Columbia TriStar.

Schaeffer starred opposite model Amanda de Cadenet in the 1997 romantic drama Fall, about a cab driver who begins a passionate affair with a model he first met in his cab.

In 2000, he released the comedy Wirey Spindell, a semi-autobiographical tale. This was followed by the romantic comedy Never Again in 2001, starring Jill Clayburgh and Jeffrey Tambor, and Mind the Gap in 2004.

In recent years Schaeffer has been writing an autobiographical blog, I Can't Believe I'm Still Single, about his relationships and ongoing search for love. Schaeffer has turned the blog into a book, I Can't Believe I'm Still Single – Sane, Slightly Neurotic (But in a Sane Way) Filmmaker into Good Yoga, Bad Reality TV, Too Much Chocolate, and a Little Kinky Sex Seeks Smart, Emotionally Evolved ... Oh Hell, At This Point Anyone Who'll Let Me Watch Football.

In 2008, Schaeffer debuted a reality television series on Showtime, also called, I Can't Believe I'm Still Single.

In 2009, Schaeffer and Jill Franklyn created the half-hour dramedy series Gravity for Starz. The series about people who have failed at suicide – originally titled Failure to Fly – stars Schaeffer along with Krysten Ritter, Ivan Sergei, Ving Rhames and Rachel Hunter. It began airing in April 2010 and on June 30, 2010, the show was cancelled.

Filmography and television work

Actor, director and screenwriter

Actor (only)

Books 
 Schaeffer, Eric (2007). I Can't Believe I'm Still Single – Sane, Slightly Neurotic (But in a Sane Way) Filmmaker into Good Yoga, Bad Reality TV, Too Much Chocolate, and a Little Kinky Sex Seeks Smart, Emotionally Evolved ... Oh Hell, At This Point Anyone Who'll Let Me Watch Football.  New York City:  Thunder's Mouth Press.  .

See also
Lists of American writers
List of film and television directors
List of people from New York City

References

External links
 
 
 Bankrate.com interview
 UGO interview

1962 births
Living people
20th-century American male actors
21st-century American male actors
Male actors from New York City
American bloggers
American male film actors
American film directors
American male screenwriters
American male television actors
Bard College alumni
Screenwriters from New York (state)
American male bloggers
21st-century American screenwriters